The women's javelin throw event at the 1990 World Junior Championships in Athletics was held in Plovdiv, Bulgaria, at Deveti Septemvri Stadium on 10 and 11 August.  An old specification 600g javelin was used.

Medalists

Results

Final
11 August

Qualifications
10 Aug

Group A

Participation
According to an unofficial count, 22 athletes from 17 countries participated in the event.

References

Javelin throw
Javelin throw at the World Athletics U20 Championships